José Alberto Benavides Castañeda (born 27 November 1970) is a Mexican politician affiliated with the PT. He currently serves as Deputy of the LXII Legislature of the Mexican Congress representing the Federal District.

References

1970 births
Living people
People from Mexico City
Labor Party (Mexico) politicians
21st-century Mexican politicians
Deputies of the LXII Legislature of Mexico
Members of the Chamber of Deputies (Mexico) for Mexico City